Bigelowia nudata, the pineland rayless goldenrod, is a species of North American flowering plant in the family Asteraceae. It is native to the coastal plain of the southeastern United States (from eastern Louisiana to North Carolina).

Bigelowia nudata is a sub-shrub that grows up to 70 cm (28 inches) tall, often forming clumps. Most of the leaves are in a rosette near the ground, with smaller and narrower leaves on the stems. Flower heads are small, yellow, and displayed in flat-topped arrays, each with 2-6 disc florets but no ray florets. The plants generally grow in swamps and bogs.

Varieties
 Bigelowia nudata var. australis (L.C.Anderson) Shinners  - Florida Panhandle
 Bigelowia nudata var. nudata - from eastern Louisiana to North Carolina

References

Astereae
Flora of the Southeastern United States
Plants described in 1803
Flora without expected TNC conservation status